Saket Elhami is an Iranian football manager who currently manages Havadar  in Persian Gulf Pro League.

He played as a player for Pas, Esteghlal Ahvaz, and Tractor.

Managerial statistics

Honours

Manager
Tractor
Hazfi Cup: 2019–20

Nassaji
Hazfi Cup: 2021–22

References

External links

Living people
Iranian football managers
1971 births
Tractor S.C. managers
People from Ardabil
PAS Hamedan F.C. players
Bahman players
Esteghlal Ahvaz players
Keshavarz players
Tractor S.C. players
Iranian footballers
Association footballers not categorized by position
F.C. Nassaji Mazandaran managers
Persian Gulf Pro League managers
Havadar S.C. managers